Henry Crookshank (13 February 1893 – 10 August 1972) was an Irish geologist who worked in the Geological Survey of India serving as its superintendent in 1944-45.

Crookshank was born in Dublin, the second son of Elizabeth née Stokes (1867–1945) and Charles Henry Crookshank (1859-1927). His mother was related to the bacteriologist Adrian Stokes and archaeologist Margaret McNair Stokes. He was educated at St. Columba's College and then Trinity College, Dublin where he studied mathematics but World War I interrupted his studies. He joined the Dublin Fusiliers in 1914 and served in the Middle East and France, while his brother Arthur who also served in the war died at Gallipoli. He returned in 1918 to study engineering and joined the Geological Survey of India in 1929. He geological work began with oil surveys near Karachi and later studied sapphires in the Vizag area, and studies in the Satpura Gondwana Basin.

Crookshank served in the Northwest Frontier in the early 1940s but was shot in both legs and flown back to Rawalpindi. After recovering he was posted in charge of mica production in Rajputana.

Crookshank married Eileen "Kitty" Mary Somerville-Lodge in 1921 at Calcutta and they had three daughters including Anne (January 3, 1927 – October 18, 2016) who became a professor of art.

References

External links 
 Interview with Mrs Crookshank
 Crookshank letters during World War I

20th-century Irish geologists
1893 births
1972 deaths
Scientists from Dublin (city)